Surmo Valley (Urdu) is a valley in the Ghangche District in Gilgit–Baltistan, Pakistan. Etymologically, the name is derived from sermo : ser means gold and mo feminises the word. A person who lives in Surmo is called Surmopa.

Location 

 
Its neighborhoods are Choghogrong, Tarkari, Khar, Gond, Langkhung, Tishari, and Ghazi-Thang, containing 800 houses and approximately 10,000 people. Cultural symbols include Rgyalmo Khar, Shagharun khar, and Minduq Sar (flower garden). It is adjacent to the river Shiok.

History

Surmo is one of the oldest valleys in Baltistan and contains 150-year-old walnut trees. In 1996, stupas were found here. Local people call this place Rgyalmo Khar (a queen's palace) as it had been a rich village. People from various places came here to seek help and their needs were fulfilled. Numerous influential persons from Surmo brought fame to the village.

Geography

Surmo is important with respect to military and transportation networks in the mountainous region. Its biggest bridge, Surmo Bridge, links Siachen region with the district capital of Khaplu, as well as Chorbat Valley, making this valley strategically important. A new reinforced concrete cement (RCC) bridge has been constructed over the Shiok River from the Reebothang side and is expected to be operational in 2021. The bridge is economically and militarily very important to the region.

Surmo was formerly a fertile and prosperous area. A well-known local expression was Surmo ma drang na gar ma drang ("if your stomach is not full or stuffed in Surmo, there is no other place it would be"). The shifts in flow of the glacier-sourced Shyok River (literally the river of death) have caused considerable damage, slow and steady devastation that resulted in landslides. Many fields were lost in this way in the past century, leaving only 20% of the fields on the river bank which are not cut-off due to flooding. Measures have been taken to stop erosion, such as defensive walls of stone. However, these seem inadequate before the large river. In 2010, the river threat reached an alarming situation where many houses had to be demolished because the river came too near. The Shiok River remains a threat to Surmo. However, the river is also necessary to irrigate the Reebothang and Choghorgal regions.

Surmo Broque 
A broque in Baltistan denotes a place entirely dedicated to agricultural activity, usually far from the population. People don't live in a broque permanently and keep shifting position between the village and broque. They are a primary source of income for lower class families.

Surmo Broque, with terraced fields hundreds of feet above the valley, is one of the most beautiful broques in Baltistan, and attracts many tourists from all over Baltistan in the summer when the broque is lush green. Khaplu Broque neighbors Surmo Broque and is approximately five times larger. With the passage of time, people's interest in the broque started to plunge. They turned their attention away from farming to more progressive ideas like education, business, etc. Today only a small percentage of the population farms in the broque and earns their living there. Today, machinery has taken over the majority of the work.

Dakholi Lake is about a few kilometers above the broque. Reabothang, a newly cultivated land near Surmo Bridge, is another source of income from farming. Allotment of land to the natives of Surmo was completed in 2009, after which Reabothang saw a rapid boost in fertility. Another enormous uncultivated land of Surmo is called Tunga.

Surmo has several beautiful meadows and lakes where local people take their livestock during the summer season. They spend the whole season there till winter. Famous meadows are Zingkhashing, Xaribroque, and Surat.

Welfare Organizations

The people of Surmo are considered as one of the more well-organized and educated people in Baltistan. Aga Khan Development Network and Anjumane Falah o Behbood Surmo are among the oldest welfare organizations in Baltistan working in the region for the welfare and development of the locals for many decades.

The young generation of Surmo is struggling in education, and dreams of Surmo as a well-developed village in the future.  Youth organization "Skarchan" is playing a vital role in various fields of life like healthcare and education as well as for better environment of the area. Skarchen was established in 2000 and has since helped build Madrsa Shah Hamdan and Faizbukhsh Public School. Skarchen is a youth organization and includes many of the youth of Surmo. Askari Tanzeem is a group which includes the retired army personnel who would play there in welfare. The main achievement of the organization is the construction of Jamia Masjid Surmo.

Unfortunately, no student welfare organization has ever existed in Surmo. This has resulted in the low literacy rate and increased unemployment. Surmo is in dire need of a student welfare organization to make students develop a high interest in education. Currently the Tarkari and Gond localities are among the most educated. Education should be given full attention.

Markazi Jamia Masjid Surmo 
Jamia Masjid Surmo stands among the prominent mosques of Baltistan. It reflects the architecture of both Baltistan and Kashmir. It was constructed many decades ago though the exact date remains unknown. A major reconstruction program was undertaken in 2003 and was successfully completed in 2008. Opening ceremony of renewed worship place was held in which prominent people from all over Baltistan were invited. The public was catered. This day was one of the most important days in history for Surmo. A magazine to commemorate the iftitah was also published by Syed Manzoor Hussain which provided complete details regarding the construction of the mosque. The mosque has many compartments namely the khanqah which is the central building, fyaqkhuru (which is used in winter), angon (for ladies and children), and chillakhut for meditation. The taharat area locally known as chaman is located outside the mosque which is a good practice. The largest congregation takes place on Jum'a prayer on Friday. Matam takes place from first of Muharram till Ashura. The mosque is open for 24 hours. The completion of the mosque was a huge success for the people of Surmo. The people of Surmo are very proud of the mosque.

References

Valleys of Gilgit-Baltistan
Ghanche District
Baltistan